Budapesti VSC created a fencing section in 1949, which had one of the most successful teams in Hungary.

Achievements

Fencing Hall
Name: Szőnyi utcai Vívócsarnok
City: Budapest, Hungary
Address: H-1142 Budapest, XIV. district, Szőnyi út 2. II. em.

International success

Olympic medalists
The team's olympic medalists are shown below.

World Championships

European Championships

Notable former fencers

Sabre
 Dániel Magay
 Attila Keresztes
 Tamás Mendelényi
 Pál Gerevich

Épée
 József Sákovics
 Csaba Fenyvesi
 Jenő Pap
 Sándor Erdős
 Attila Fekete
 Hajnalka Tóth
 Iván Kovács
 Tamás Pádár

Foil
 Ilona Elek
 Margit Elek
 Magdolna Nyári-Kovács
 Katalin Kiss
 Judit Ágoston-Mendelényi
 Jenő Kamuti
 Ferenc Czvikovszky
 Györgyi Marvalics-Székely
 Ildikó Farkasinszky-Bóbis
 Magda Maros
 Zsolt Érsek

See also
Hungarian Fencer of the Year

References

External links
Fencing section website 
Official Budapesti VSC website 

Fencing
Budapesti VSC
Sports clubs established in 1949
Fencing clubs